Fortune Harbour or Fortune Harbor is a designated place in the Canadian province of Newfoundland and Labrador.

History 
The 1913 McAlpine Gazeteer lists the community in Twillingate district:
"FORTUNE HARBOR, a post and money order settlement in Twillingate district. Contains postal telegraph, express, 1 store, 1 Catholic church, Bowring Bros. and Reid Nfld. steamers call during open navigation."

An 1884 pilot guide discusses "Fortune harbor" in Notre Dame Bay:
"Fortune harbor is a land-locked anchorage, situated 2 miles southeastward of Bagg head. Two entrances are formed by Sweeny island, that to the eastward of the island being only 30 yards wide and having a depth of 12 feet at low water. The western entrance is suitable for large vessels with a commanding breeze, but the turns are sharp, the wind is often baffling in the approach, and the squalls heavy, particularly with westerly winds.

Geography 
Fortune Harbour is in Newfoundland within Subdivision E of Division No. 8.

Demographics 

See also 
List of communities in Newfoundland and Labrador
List of designated places in Newfoundland and Labrador

References

External links 
 Audio recording of a traditional folktale from Fortune Harbour

Designated places in Newfoundland and Labrador
Bays of Newfoundland and Labrador